The InterPlanetary File System (IPFS) is a protocol, hypermedia and file sharing peer-to-peer network for storing and sharing data in a distributed file system. IPFS uses content-addressing to uniquely identify each file in a global namespace connecting IPFS hosts.

IPFS can among others replace the location based hypermedia server protocols http and https to distribute the World Wide Web.

Design 

IPFS allows users to host and receive content in a manner similar to BitTorrent. As opposed to a centrally located server, IPFS is built around a decentralized system of user-operators who hold a portion of the overall data, creating a resilient system of file storage and sharing. Any user in the network can serve a file by its content address, and other peers in the network can find and request that content from any node who has it using a distributed hash table (DHT).

In contrast to BitTorrent, IPFS aims to create a single global network. This means that if two users publish a block of data with the same hash, the peers downloading the content from "user 1" will also exchange data with the ones downloading it from "user 2". IPFS aims to replace protocols used for static webpage delivery by using gateways which are accessible with HTTP. Users may choose not to install an IPFS client on their device and instead use a public gateway. A list of these gateways is maintained on the IPFS GitHub page.

History 

IPFS was created by Juan Benet, who later founded Protocol Labs in May 2014. 

IPFS was launched in an alpha version in February 2015, and by October of the same year was described by TechCrunch as "quickly spreading by word of mouth."

Applications 

 Filecoin is an IPFS-based cooperative storage cloud, also authored by Protocol Labs.
 Cloudflare runs a distributed web gateway to simplify, speed up, and secure access to IPFS without needing a local node.
 Microsoft's self-sovereign identity system, Microsoft ION, builds on the Bitcoin blockchain and IPFS through a Sidetree-based DID network.
 The shadow libraries Anna's Archive and Library Genesis also deliver books via IPFS, enabling the largest human library of books to be more resilient.
 Brave uses Origin Protocol and IPFS to host its decentralized merchandise store and, in 2021, added support into their browser.
 Opera for Android has default support for IPFS, allowing mobile users to browse  links to access data on the IPFS network.
 Superhighway84 is an IPFS-based Usenet-like discussion system
 Filebase is a geo-redundant IPFS Pinning Service that pins each file to the IPFS network with 3 redundant copies stored across diverse geographic locations.

Anti-censorship 

 The Catalan independence referendum, taking place in September–October 2017, was deemed illegal by the Constitutional Court of Spain and many related websites were blocked. Subsequently, the Catalan Pirate Party mirrored the website on IPFS to bypass the High Court of Justice of Catalonia order of blocking.
 During the block of Wikipedia in Turkey, IPFS was used to create a mirror of Wikipedia, which allowed access to archived static Wikipedia content despite the ban. The mirror has now been expanded to more languages, such as English, Ukrainian, Russian, Arabic, and Chinese. A collection of the mirrors can be viewed by using its CID at an IPFS Gateway.

Malware 

Phishing attacks have also been distributed through Cloudflare's IPFS gateway since July 2018. The phishing scam HTML is stored on IPFS, and displayed via Cloudflare's gateway. The connection shows as secure via a Cloudflare SSL certificate.

The IPStorm botnet, first detected in June 2019, uses IPFS so it can hide its command-and-control amongst the flow of legitimate data on the IPFS network. Security researchers had worked out previously the theoretical possibility of using IPFS as a botnet command-and-control system.

See also 

 Content-addressable storage
 Dat (software)
 Distributed file system
 Freenet
 GNUnet
 Mnet (peer-to-peer network) aka MojoNation
 ZeroNet

References

External links 
 

Application layer protocols
Computer-related introductions in 2015
Distributed data storage
Distributed file systems
File transfer protocols
Free network-related software
Free software programmed in Python
Internet privacy software
Internet protocols
Network protocols
Peer-to-peer computing